Zurab Nasaraya (born 19 October 1973) is a Georgian politician who currently serves as the Governor of Guria.

Political career
In 1999 Zurab Nasaraya began his political career in Poti local council becoming a Member of Parliament in 2002 serving on both the Committee on Tax Revenue, Finance & Budget as well as the Interim Corruption Investigation Commission. In 2004 he left politics getting jobs in the Georgian Railways and reentered politics again on the 30 August 2018 as Governor of the Guria region of Georgia.

See also 
List of Georgians
Cabinet of Georgia

References

1973 births
Living people
Politicians from Georgia (country)
Tbilisi State University alumni